Caister-on-Sea railway station is a former railway station in Norfolk, England. It was opened in 1877. It later became part of the Midland and Great Northern Joint Railway route from Birmingham to Great Yarmouth, predominantly used by holidaymakers. The station was a few miles north of the terminus at Yarmouth Beach railway station. The station closed with the rest of the line in 1959. The station was demolished after closure and houses now cover the site.

References

Disused railway stations in Norfolk
Former Midland and Great Northern Joint Railway stations
Railway stations in Great Britain opened in 1877
Railway stations in Great Britain closed in 1959
Caister-on-Sea